Aleksandr Fyodorovich Manachinsky (2 September 1958 – 1 January 2020) was a Ukrainian swimmer. He competed at the 1976 Summer Olympics in the 100 m and 200 m butterfly and finished eighth in the latter event. During his career he won three national titles, in the 100 m (1977) and 200 m (1976) butterfly and 4 × 100 m medley relay (1976).

Between 1975 and 2000 he worked as a swimming coach with the Soviet and then Ukrainian national teams.

Manachinsky died on 1 January 2020 at the age of 61.

References

External links
Personal web page

1958 births
2020 deaths
Male butterfly swimmers
Ukrainian male swimmers
Olympic swimmers of the Soviet Union
Swimmers at the 1976 Summer Olympics
Sportspeople from Kharkiv
Soviet male swimmers